The women's shot put was an event at the 1956 Summer Olympics in Melbourne, Australia. The event was also known at the time as putting the weight. The qualification round mark was set on 13.00 metres. Three athletes didn't pass that distance in the heats.

Summary
Her still standing Olympic record survived the qualifying round, the farthest throw only 14.43m. In the first round, returning silver medalist Marianne Werner set the new record with 15.61m. That only stood until Zybina threw 16.35m, to add a meter to the old record and surpass Werner by over two feet. Later Tamara Tyshkevich threw 16.13m to take over silver position. Zybina threw 16.32m on her second attempt, which was matched by Tyshkevich on her third, putting her only 3 cm behind. Zybina's fifth throw went 16.48m, another Olympic record. On her final attempt, Tyshkevich threw it , another Olympic record. Zybina answered with her best attempt of the day, but 16.53m would no longer qualify as the Olympic record and only got her a silver medal.

Final classification

References

External links
 Official Report
 Results

W
Shot put at the Olympics
1956 in women's athletics
Ath